Locking Horns is an album by trumpeter Joe Newman and saxophonist Zoot Sims recorded in 1957 and originally released on the Rama label before it was sold to Roulette Records.

Reception

AllMusic awarded the album 4 stars.

Track listing
All compositions by Adriano Acea except as indicated
 "Corky" (Joe Newman) - 4:45
 "Mambo for Joe" - 3:50
 "Wolafunt's Lament" (Bill Graham) - 3:45
 "Midnite Fantasy" - 3:35
 "'Tater Pie" - 3:35
 "Oh Shaye" - 3:50
 "Bassing Around" (Osie Johnson) - 3:59
 "Oh Joe" (Newman) - 4:30
 "Susette" - 4:00
 "Similar Souls" (Johnson) - 6:18

Personnel 
Joe Newman - trumpet
Zoot Sims - tenor saxophone
Adrian Acea - piano
Oscar Pettiford - bass
Osie Johnson - drums

References 

1957 albums
Joe Newman (trumpeter) albums
Zoot Sims albums
Roulette Records albums